In statistical mechanics, the eight-vertex model is a generalisation of the ice-type (six-vertex) models; it was discussed by Sutherland, and Fan & Wu, and solved by Baxter in the zero-field case.

Description

As with the ice-type models, the eight-vertex model is a square lattice model, where each state is a configuration of arrows at a vertex. The allowed vertices have an even number of arrows pointing towards the vertex; these include the six inherited from the ice-type model (1-6), and sinks and sources (7, 8).

We consider a  lattice, with  vertices and  edges. Imposing periodic boundary conditions requires that the states 7 and 8 occur equally often, as do states 5 and 6, and thus can be taken to have the same energy. For the zero-field case the same is true for the two other pairs of states. Each vertex  has an associated energy  and Boltzmann weight , giving the partition function over the lattice as

where the summation is over all allowed configurations of vertices in the lattice. In this general form the partition function remains unsolved.

Solution in the zero-field case

The zero-field case of the model corresponds physically to the absence of external electric fields. Hence, the model remains unchanged under the reversal of all arrows; the states 1 and 2, and 3 and 4, consequently must occur as pairs. The vertices can be assigned arbitrary weights 

The solution is based on the observation that rows in transfer matrices commute, for a certain parametrisation of these four Boltzmann weights. This came about as a modification of an alternate solution for the six-vertex model; it makes use of elliptic theta functions.

Commuting transfer matrices

Using the star-triangle relation, Baxter reformulated this condition as equivalent to a parametrisation of the weights given as

Here snh is the hyperbolic analogue of sn, given by

The associated transfer matrix  thus is a function of  alone; for all ,

The matrix function 

The other crucial part of the solution is the existence of a nonsingular matrix-valued function , such that for all complex  the matrices  commute with each other and the transfer matrices, and satisfy

where

The existence and commutation relations of such a function are demonstrated by considering pair propagations through a vertex, and periodicity relations of the theta functions, in a similar way to the six-vertex model.

Explicit solution

The commutation of matrices in  allow them to be diagonalised, and thus eigenvalues can be found. The partition function is calculated from the maximal eigenvalue, resulting in a free energy per site of  

for

The eight vertex model was also solved in quasicrystals.

Equivalence with an Ising model

There is a natural correspondence between the eight-vertex model, and the Ising model with 2-spin and 4-spin nearest neighbour interactions. The states of this model are spins  on faces of a square lattice. The analogue of 'edges' in the eight-vertex model are products of spins on adjacent faces:

The most general form of the energy for this model is

We denote horizontal and vertical spins (arrows on edges) in the eight-vertex model ,  respectively, and define up and right as positive directions. The restriction on vertex states is that the product of four edges at a vertex is 1; this automatically holds for Ising 'edges'. Each  configuration then corresponds to a unique  ,  configuration, whereas each  ,  configuration gives two choices of  configurations.

It follows that in the zero-field case of the eight-vertex model, the horizontal and vertical interactions in the corresponding Ising model vanish.

These relations gives the equivalence  between the partition functions of the eight-vertex model, and the 2,4-spin Ising model. Consequently a solution in either model would lead immediately to a solution in the other.

See also
Six-vertex model
Transfer-matrix method
Ising model

Notes

References

Exactly solvable models
Statistical mechanics
Lattice models